There are at least 39 named mountains in Phillips County, Montana.
 Antoine Butte, el. 
 Barnard Buttes, el. 
 Bear Mountain, el. 
 Beaver Mountain, el. 
 Brandon Butte, el. 
 Button Butte, el. 
 Coal Mine Hill, el. 
 Coburn Butte, el. 
 Collins Hill, el. 
 Coming Day Butte, el. 
 Damon Hill, el. 
 Double S Hill, el. 
 Fanny Hill, el. 
 Fortress Butte, el. 
 Gold Bug Butte, el. 
 Green Mountain, el. 
 Haystack Butte, el. 
 Hubert Hill, el. 
 Indian Peak, el. 
 Larb Hills, el. 
 Mickey Butte, el. 
 Mission Peak, el. 
 Old Scraggy Peak, el. 
 Reynolds Hill, el. 
 Ricker Butte, el. 
 Saddle Butte, el. 
 Saskatchewan Butte, el. 
 Schuyler Butte, el. 
 Sharette Butte, el. 
 Shell Butte, el. 
 Silver Peak, el. 
 Spring Park Butte, el. 
 Square Butte, el. 
 Sugar Loaf Butte, el. 
 Tea Kettle Butte, el. 
 Thornhill Butte, el. 
 Travois Butte, el. 
 Turkey Track Hill, el. 
 Whitcomb Butte, el.

See also
 List of mountains in Montana
 List of mountain ranges in Montana

Notes

Landforms of Phillips County, Montana
Phillips